William Green (1760–1823) was an English artist, poet, writer, and landscape painter, who made images mainly of the Lake District, determined to make them "adhere as faithfully as possible to nature." His biographer, Charles Roeder, stated: "his novel method is notable, as the artists have all a conventional and uniform style in regard to the representation of mountains. Those of Mr Green are veritable mountains; he says that he knows their anatomy and he is undoubtedly right."

In 1819, Green completed a major work, The Tourist's New Guide to the Lake District. But he became troubled, and by 1820 his constitution was weakened.

His daughter, Elizabeth, married Walter H Mayson, a famous British violin maker.

References

External links 
William Green on the Armitt Website

1760 births
1823 deaths
18th-century British painters
British male painters
19th-century British painters
19th-century British male artists